Leader of the Starry Skies: A Tribute to Tim Smith, Songbook 1 is a compilation album featuring cover versions of songs by Tim Smith, the songwriter behind Cardiacs, The Sea Nymphs, Spratleys Japs and his solo project OceanLandWorld. It was released on CD on 13 December 2010 on the Believers Roast label (via Genepool distribution).  The release date for download, via iTunes, was 20 December 2010.

All contributing artists and bands have either stated a strong Cardiacs influence in their music, profess sincere admiration for Smith's work, or feature at least one person who has at some time been involved with Cardiacs. Contributors to the project include The Magic Numbers, Robert White of The Milk and Honey Band with Andy Partridge (XTC), Steven Wilson of Porcupine Tree, Katharine Blake of Mediaeval Baebes, progressive rock band Oceansize, Julianne Regan of All About Eve, 1990's Britpop band Ultrasound (who reunited especially to record their cover version), Jason Pegg of Clearlake and no less than five current or former Cardiacs members - former keyboard player William D. Drake, former drummer and keyboard player Mark Cawthra, former guitarist Bic Hayes (under the project name of mikrokosmos), current guitarist Kavus Torabi (with his Knifeworld project) and former drummer Peter Tagg (with the Trudy).

The album was recorded as a response to Tim Smith's hospitalisation in 2008 (following a combined heart attack and stroke in London) was released in order to raise funds for his ongoing care and recovery. All profits from the album sales went directly to help Tim Smith. A bonus disc, called A Loyal Companion, was free with CD preorders.

Track listing 
Leader of the Starry Skies: A Tribute to Tim Smith, Songbook 1
 "Savour" - William D. Drake
 "Big Ship" - Ultrasound
 "Fear" - Oceansize
 "Let Alone My Plastic Doll" - Mark Cawthra
 "Day Is Gone" - The Trudy
 "Foundling" - Stars In Battledress
 "Will Bleed Amen" - Max Tundra featuring Sarah Measures
 "Shaping the River" - Julianne Regan 
 "The Stench of Honey" - Knifeworld
 "A Little Man and a House" - The Magic Numbers
 "Is This the Life?" - mikrokosmos
 "March" - North Sea Radio Orchestra
 "Lillywhite's Party" - Robert White featuring Andy Partridge
 "Wind and Rains is Cold" - Rose Kemp vs. Rarg
 "Up in Annie's Room" - Katharine Blake
 "Stoneage Dinosaurs" - Steven Wilson
 "Home of Fadeless Splendour" - The Scaramanga Six
Leader of the Starry Skies: A Tribute to Tim Smith – A Loyal Companion
 "Spell With a Shell" - Silvery
 "Arnald" - Eureka Machines
 "Gloomy News" - The Gasman
 "My Trademark" - Bug Prentice
 "Victory Egg" - Sidi Bou Said
 "To Go Off and Things" - Panixphere
 "I Hold My Love in My Arms" - Local Girls
 "Dirty Boy" - Sterbus
 "Tree Tops High" - Jason Pegg
 "Everything is Easy" - The Scaramanga Six
 "Joining The Plankton" - a/c woods
 "Dead Mouse" - Spiritwo
 "All Spectacular" - Agency
 "Nurses Whispering Verses" - Idiot Box
 "The Barnacle Tree" - Sarah Cutts (hidden track)
 "Odd Even" - Local Girls (digital only, hidden track)
 "Dead Mouse" - Ham Legion (digital only, hidden track)
 "A Duck And Roger The Horse" - Stephen EvEns (digital only, hidden track)

References

External links 
 Order page at The Genepool
 Review in The Line of Best Fit
 Article on BBC Wiltshire website
 Interview with Steven Wllson on BBC Beds, Herts & Bucks website

Cardiacs compilation albums
2010 compilation albums
Cardiacs tribute albums